The Ligne nouvelle Paris - Normandie (LNPN) (English: "Paris – Normandy new line"), also known as the LGV Normandie (French: LGV for ligne à grande vitesse) is a planned French high-speed rail line project to link Paris and Normandy. Trains will run at 250 km/h (155 mph) with a new TGV station serving Rouen.

History
The 1991 diagram of the proposed LGV network already included the LGV Normandie. This was to begin in the Parisian suburbs and would split into two branches near Mantes-la-Jolie; one leading towards Rouen, the other ending near Évreux. This project was abandoned due to profitability concerns (the cost of replacing the current Corails with TGVs would be high, whereas the time gain would be modest). The Basse-Normandie and Haute-Normandie regions would therefore have to content themselves with a more basic project improving the infrastructure of the "classic" line.

Current project
The current LGV Normandie project, which followed several years later, is more ambitious than the foregoing:
 In addition to the Paris-Normandy route, it provides for internal links inside Normandy (TER-GV) and intra-provincial connections
 The project connects to the three principal cities of Normandy: Rouen, Caen and Le Havre are linked to Paris entirely by LGV

This "new" version of the LGV Normandie would begin in the Parisian suburb of Nanterre, on the regular Paris-Poissy line. A connection is foreseen in order to serve La Défense from Normandy. The line would then follow in large part the A14 and A13 motorways until Oissel, south of Rouen, where two links towards Rouen and perhaps a new station would be constructed. The line would then follow the left bank of the river Seine until a triangle junction situated east of Honfleur; from here a line would cross the Seine between Normandy and Tancarville bridges, ending in a link which would enable service to Le Havre. After Honfleur junction, the LGV would border the sea and a connection would serve Deauville. The LGV would end in Cagny, near Caen, enabling TGVs to serve Caen but not Cherbourg.

The line would therefore permit the linking of Rouen and Paris in 30 minutes, Le Havre and Paris in 50 minutes, and Caen to Paris in less than an hour. Additionally it would enable high-speed connections between Caen-Rouen, Caen-Le Havre and Rouen-Le Havre.

Connected projects
 The LGV Picardie would link Normandy and the North of France, Brussels, Picardy and the eastern French region

References

Normandie
Transport in Normandy
Proposed railway lines in France